Det är aldrig för sent is a 1956 Swedish drama film directed by Barbro Boman.

Cast
 Inga Landgré as Görel Rocke
 Marianne Aminoff as Birgit Karpell
 Renée Björling as Jeanne
 Bengt Blomgren as Arne Rocke
 Gunnar Björnstrand as Professor Rocke
 Hugo Björne as Gustafsson
 Ulla-Carin Rydén as Karin
 Sif Ruud as Dagmar, Cook
 Märta Dorff as Housemaid
 Kaj Nohrborg as Axel
 Hans Strååt as Art Dealer

References

External links
 

1956 films
1956 drama films
Swedish drama films
1950s Swedish-language films
1950s Swedish films
Swedish black-and-white films